Attorney General Rowe may refer to:

Colin Rowe (politician) (1911–1970), Attorney-General of South Australia
G. Steven Rowe (born 1953), Attorney General of Maine